The 1906 New Hampshire gubernatorial election was held on November 6, 1906. Republican nominee Charles M. Floyd defeated Democratic nominee Nathan C. Jameson with 49.79% of the vote.

General election

Candidates
Major party candidates
Charles M. Floyd, Republican
Nathan C. Jameson, Democratic

Other candidates
Edmund B. Tetley, Prohibition
W.H. McFall, Socialist

Results

References

1906
New Hampshire
Gubernatorial